Panchita is a town in West Bengal, India.

Panchita may also refer to

People
La Panchita (died 2014), a Mexican singer
Francita Alavez (c. 1816 – c. 1906), or Panchita Alavez, a Mexican known as the "Angel of Goliad", 
Francisca Subirana (1900–1981), a Spanish tennis player usually known as Panchita Subirana
Nadine Panchita Marshall (born 1972), an English actress

Music and art
 La princesa Panchita (1958), a composition by Luis Advis
 "Panchita Zorolla", a portrait by the artist William Strang
"La Abuela Panchita", a story by Isabel Allende